This is a list of abbreviations and acronyms commonly used in the sanitation sector or more broadly in the WASH sector.

A
 AA - Activated alumina
 ADB - Asian Development Bank
 ABR - Anaerobic baffled reactor - improved septic tank with baffles, see also Anaerobic digestion and DEWATS
 ACP - Anaerobic contact process
 AD - Anaerobic digestion
 AF - Anaerobic filters, see also Anaerobic digestion
 AfDB - African Development Bank 
 AfWA - African Water Association
 AIT - Asian Institute of Technology in Bangkok, Thailand
 aka or a.k.a. - "also known as"
 AMCOW - African Ministers’ Council on Water
 As - Arsenic
 ATS - Aerobic treatment system
 AusAID - Australian Agency for International Development
 AWF - African Water Facility, an initiative of the African Ministers’ Council on Water (AMCOW), hosted and administered by African Development Bank (AfDB)

B
 BCC - Behavioral change communication
 BMGF - Bill and Melinda Gates Foundation
 BMZ - Federal Ministry for Economic Cooperation and Development
 BOD or BOD5 - Biological oxygen demand (measured for five days)
 BOP or BoP - Bottom of the pyramid (or base of the pyramid) 
 BOT - Build-operate-transfer
 BSF - Black soldier fly or Biosand filter
 BSFL - Black soldier fly larvae

C
 cap - capita, as per capita (or per person)
 CAPEX - Capital expenditure
 CATS - Community approaches to total sanitation, a term coined by UNICEF
 CBO - Community-based organization 
 CBOD - Carbonaceous biochemical oxygen demand
 CBS - Container-based sanitation
 CCT - Conditional cash transfer
 CHC - Community Health Clubs
 CHP - Combined heat and power
 CLTS - Community-led total sanitation
 CLUES - Community Led Urban Environmental Sanitation
 CFU - Colony-forming unit
COD - Controlled open defecation
COD - Chemical oxygen demand
 CoP - Community of practice
 CP - Contact precipitation, see precipitation
 CSO - Combined sewer overflow or Civil Society Organization (same as Non-governmental organization)
 CSR - Corporate social responsibility
 CW - Constructed wetland

D
 DALY - Disability-adjusted life year
 DEWATS - Decentralized wastewater treatment system
 DFID - Department for International Development (United Kingdom)
 DNA - Deoxyribonucleic acid
 DO - Dissolved oxygen
 DRC - Democratic Republic of the Congo
 DRR - Disaster risk reduction

E
 Ecosan - Ecological sanitation
 EC - Electrical conductivity
 Eh - Redox potential
 EIA - Environmental impact assessment
 EM - Effective microorganisms
 EN - European standards (the N stands for Normalisation in French), e.g. EN 12566
 EPA - United States Environmental Protection Agency
 EPS - Extracellular polymeric substances
 EQND - Equality and nondiscrimination
 ESARO - East and Southern Africa Region
 EU - European Union

F
 FAO - Food and Agriculture Organization of the United Nations
 FAQ - Frequently asked questions
 FC - Fecal coliforms
 FECR - Fecal egg count reduction; closest article is on anthelmintic 
 FFS (or F4S) - Fit for School
 FGD - Focus group discussion; closest article may be Qualitative psychological research
 FGM - Female genital mutilation
 FOAM - Focus on Opportunity, Ability and Motivation
 FS - Fecal (or faecal) sludge; closest article is septage
 FSM - Fecal (or faecal) sludge management
 FSSM - Fecal sludge and septage management 
 FSTP - Fecal sludge treatment plant
 FTI - Faecally transmitted infections; closest article is fecal-oral transmission

G
 GAP - Good agricultural practices
GHG - Greenhouse gases
 GIZ - Deutsche Gesellschaft für Internationale Zusammenarbeit
 GLAAS - UN-Water Global Analysis and Assessment of Sanitation and Drinking-Water
 GPS - Global positioning system
 GSF - Global sanitation fund, closest page is Water Supply and Sanitation Collaborative Council

H
 HACCP - Hazard analysis and critical control points
 hab. - inhabitant or user, used in design parameters of wastewater treatment, e.g. 60 g BOD/hab.
 HAI - Hospital-acquired infection
 HCF - Health care facility
HEDF - Human excreta derived fertiliser (see reuse of excreta)
 HEW - Health Extension Worker
 HH - Household
 HIA - Health impact assessment
 HQ - Headquarters
 HRWS - Human right to water and sanitation
 HWF - Handwashing facility

I
 ICT - Information and communications technology
 IDP - Internally displaced person, often used as "IDP camp"
 IEC - Information, education, communication; closest article may be Behavior change (public health)
 INR - Indian rupee, currency in India
 IWRM - Integrated water resources management

J
 JMP - Joint Monitoring Programme for Water Supply and Sanitation of WHO and UNICEF

K
 KAP - Knowledge, attitude and practice
 kL (or Kl) - Kilo liters (or 1000 liters, same as 1 cubic meter)
 KM - Knowledge management
 Ksh - Kenyan shilling, currency in Kenya
 KVIP - Kumasi ventilated-improved pit, closest article is Pit latrine

L
 L - Lakh, used for one hundred thousand in India
 L - Liter (or litre in British English spelling)
 LCC - Life-cycle cost, see Whole-life cost or Life-cycle cost analysis
 LCCA - Life-cycle cost analysis
 LGA - Local government area
 LMICs - Low and middle income countries 
LNOB - Leave no one behind
 lpcd - Liters per capita per day (liters per person per day), e.g. for daily wastewater flowrate

M
 MBBR - Moving Bed Biofilm Reactor
 MBR - Membrane bioreactor
 MCA - Multiple criteria analysis, see Multiple-criteria decision analysis
 MCDA - Multiple-criteria decision analysis
 MDA - Mass drug administration
 MDG - Millennium Development Goal
 M&E - Monitoring and evaluation
 MENA - Middle East and North Africa
 MFC - Microbial fuel cell
 MFI - Microfinance institution
 mg  - Milligram
 μg - Microgram
 MHM - Menstrual hygiene management
 ML - Megaliter or 1 million liter or 1000 cubic meters
 MLD - Million liters per day
 MOH - Ministry of health (see also List of health departments and ministries)
 MOOC - Massive open online course
 MOS - Manual of style, see also: MOS for WikiProject Sanitation
 MoU - Memorandum of understanding
 MoUD  - Ministry of Urban Development
 MSW - Municipal solid waste

N
 NBA - Nirmal Bharat Abhiyan in India, formerly called "Total Sanitation Campaign" (TSC) - not to be confused with CLTS
 NGO - Non-governmental organization
 NIMBY - Not In My Back Yard
 NRW - Non-revenue water
NSS - Non-sewered sanitation (similar term to fecal sludge management)
 NTDs - Neglected tropical diseases

O
 OBA - Output based aid
 OD - Open defecation
 ODA - Official development assistance
 ODK - Open Data Kit
 O&M - Operation and maintenance
 ODF - Open defecation free, i.e. a community without open defecation taking place
 OP - Omni Processor
 OPEX - Operational expenditure (or operating expense)
 ORP - Oxidation reduction potential
 ORT - Oral rehydration therapy

P
 PbR - Payment by results
 PC - Preventive chemotherapy; closest article is helminthiasis
 PFU - Plaque-forming unit
 PHC - Primary health centre
 PIM - Post implementation monitoring; no article yet, see WASH
 PMU - Project management unit
 PSP - Public sector participation, see also Public–private partnership
 PVC - Polyvinyl chloride
 PPP - Public private partnership
 ppm - Parts per million
 ppb - Parts per billion

Q
 QA/QC - Quality assurance / quality control
 Q&A - Question and answer, see also FAQ
 QMRA - Quantitative Microbiological Risk Assessment

R
 RBF - Results-based financing, see also Output based aid or Payment by Results
 RCT - Randomized controlled trial
 R&D - Research and development
 RNA - Ribonucleic acid
 RRR - Resource Recovery and Reuse
 RTI - Reproductive tract infection
 RTTC - Reinvent the Toilet Challenge, an R&D funding scheme by the Bill and Melinda Gates Foundation
 RVO - Rijksdienst voor Ondernemend Nederland (Netherlands Enterprise Agency)

S
 SAR - Sodium adsorption ratio
 SBA (or SBM) - Swachh Bharat Abhiyan, Clean India Mission or Swachh Bharat Mission
 SBR - Sequencing batch reactor
 SDG - Sustainable Development Goal 
 SDG6 - Sustainable Development Goal Number 6: "Clean Water and Sanitation"
 SFD - Shit Flow Diagram, see example here
 SHG - Self-help group
 SLA - Service-level agreement
 SLB - Service-level benchmarking
 SLTS - School-led total sanitation, see Community-led total sanitation
 SME - Small and medium-sized enterprise
 SMS - Short message service
 SOP - Standard operating procedure
 STP - Sewage treatment plant
 SRHR - Sexual and reproductive health and rights
 SRT - Solids retention time, see also Activated sludge
 SS - Suspended solids
 SSA - Sub-Saharan Africa
 SSLA - Sanitation Service-level agreement
 SSP - Sanitation safety planning; closest page might be Water safety plan
 SuSanA - Sustainable Sanitation Alliance
 SWASH - School Water, Sanitation and Hygiene, see Water, Sanitation and Hygiene

T
 T90 - Time at which 90 percent reduction in pathogens is achieved
 TAF - Technology Applicability Framework
 ThOD - Theoretical oxygen demand
 ToR - Terms of reference
 TSC - Total sanitation campaign in India, now called Nirmal Bharat Abhiyan - not to be confused with CLTS
 TSS - Total suspended solids (in sanitary engineering) or Toxic_shock_syndrome (medical field) 
 TSSM - Total Sanitation and Sanitation Marketing
 TSU - Technical support unit

U
 UASB - Upflow anaerobic sludge blanket reactor
 UCD - User-centered design
 UDDT - Urine-diverting dry toilet
 UDT - Urine diversion toilet
 UDFT - Urine Diverting Flush Toilet
 μg - Microgram
 ULB - Urban local body
 UNDP - United Nations Development Programme
 UNEP - United Nations Environment Programme
 UNSGAB - United Nations Secretary General's Advisory Board on Water and Sanitation
 USEPA - United States Environmental Protection Agency
 UTI - Urinary tract infection

V
 VIP - Ventilated improved pit latrine
 VND - Vietnamese Dong (currency in Vietnam)

W
 WASH or WaSH - Water, sanitation and hygiene
WASH2 - Water, sanitation, hygiene and health
 WatSan - Water and sanitation, used in the same way as WASH
 WC - Water closet
 WEF - Water-Energy-Food nexus
 WG - Working group, e.g. working groups of SuSanA
 WinS - WASH in schools
 WHO - World Health Organization
WPM - Water point mapping
 WSP: 
 Water and sanitation program of the World Bank 
 Water safety plan
 Waste stabilization pond
 WSUP - Water and sanitation for the urban poor
 WSH - Water, sanitation, hygiene
 WSSCC - Water Supply and Sanitation Collaborative Council
 WTD - World Toilet Day
 WTP:
 Water treatment plant
 Willingness to pay
 WWD - World Water Day
 WWTP - Wastewater treatment plant
 WYSIWYG - What You See is What You Get

See also 

 Wikiproject Sanitation
 List of water supply and sanitation by country

References 

Lists of abbreviations
Sanitation